Larry R. Brown (February 9, 1943 – August 16, 2012) was a member of the North Carolina House of Representatives. He was first elected in 2004 after defeating Rep. Michael P. Decker in the Republican primary. Decker had spent most of his last term as a Democrat although he had been elected earlier as a Republican.

Brown served in the U.S. Navy from 1965 to 1968. He earned a bachelor's degree from Central Wesleyan College (South Carolina), now known as Southern Wesleyan University. Brown then worked for the US Postal Service and later as a real estate broker.

Brown and his wife Martha were the parents of two children.

Brown was criticized by a gay rights organization for using anti-gay slurs in an e-mail to fellow House members in 2010.

Following redistricting, Brown was defeated for another term in the May 2012 Republican primary. He died later that year, while still in office.

Elections

2012

2010

2008

2006

2004

References

External links
North Carolina General Assembly bio of Brown
Brown's campaign webpage
Vote Smart bio of Brown

1943 births
2012 deaths
Southern Wesleyan University alumni
Members of the North Carolina House of Representatives
North Carolina Republicans
North Carolina Democrats
People from Kernersville, North Carolina
21st-century American politicians